In the medulla oblongata, the arcuate nucleus is a group of neurons located on the anterior surface of the medullary pyramids. These nuclei are the extension of the pontine nuclei. They receive fibers from the corticospinal tract and send their axons through the anterior external arcuate fibers and medullary striae to the cerebellum via the inferior cerebellar peduncle.

Arcuate nuclei are capable of chemosensitivity and have a proven role in the respiratory center controlling the breathing rate.

Additional images

External links
 
 PubMed article

Respiratory physiology
Medulla oblongata